Get on Up may refer to:

Film
 Get on Up (film), a 2014 biographical drama about the life of American funk musician James Brown

Music
 "Get on Up" (The Esquires song), a 1967 song by the Esquires
 "Get on Up" (Jodeci song), a 1995 song by Jodeci
 "Get on Up", a 2015 song by Pegboard Nerds and Jauz

See also
Get On Up and Dance, 1996 album by Quad City DJ's
"Get on Up and Do It Again", 1981 song by Suzy Q
"Get Up (I Feel Like Being a) Sex Machine", a 1970 funk song recorded by James Brown with Bobby Byrd on backing vocals, which contains "get on up" as a lyric in several instances
"Get Up Offa That Thing", a 1976 song written and performed by James Brown
 Get Up (disambiguation)